Willibald Charles Bianchi (March 12, 1915 – January 9, 1945) was an officer in the Philippine Scouts who received the Medal of Honor for actions in Bataan, Philippines during that country's capitulation to Japanese forces during World War II. After the action near Bagac in the Bataan Province, Bianchi was among the troops captured by the Japanese at the fall of Bataan, on April 9, 1942. He was part of the Bataan "Death March," and was imprisoned in several Japanese prisoner of war camps, enduring horrible conditions. He was known for his compassion and efforts to better the lot of his fellow prisoners by bartering with their captors for extra food and medicine. On January 9, 1945, while imprisoned in an unmarked Japanese prison ship, Bianchi was killed instantly when an American plane, unaware that the ship contained American prisoners, dropped a 1,000-pound bomb in the cargo hold. Bianchi is one of three members of the Philippine Scouts who were awarded the Medal of Honor.

Early life and education
Bianchi graduated from South Dakota State University in 1939, and received an ROTC commission in 1940.

Medal of Honor citation

For conspicuous gallantry and intrepidity above and beyond the call of duty in action with the enemy on 3 February 1942, near Bagac, Province of Bataan, Philippine Islands. When the rifle platoon of another company was ordered to wipe out 2 strong enemy machinegun nests, 1st Lt. Bianchi voluntarily and of his own initiative, advanced with the platoon leading part of the men. When wounded early in the action by 2 bullets through the left hand, he did not stop for first aid but discarded his rifle and began firing a pistol. He located a machinegun nest and personally silenced it with grenades. When wounded the second time by 2 machinegun bullets through the chest muscles, 1st Lt. Bianchi climbed to the top of an American tank, manned its antiaircraft machinegun, and fired into strongly held enemy position until knocked completely off the tank by a third severe wound.

Honors
Bianchi attended South Dakota State University and a monument was erected honoring him and fellow alumnus and Medal of Honor recipient Leo K. Thorsness.

See also

List of Medal of Honor recipients for World War II
List of Italian American Medal of Honor recipients

References

External links

Cenopath memorial for Bianchi at Manila National Cemetery

People from New Ulm, Minnesota
1915 births
United States Army Medal of Honor recipients
United States Army personnel killed in World War II
United States Army officers
American expatriates in the Philippines
1945 deaths
World War II recipients of the Medal of Honor
Deaths by airstrike during World War II
Military personnel from Minnesota